Mistaria fagei is a species of spider in the family Agelenidae. It is native to Kenya. It was first described by Caporiacco in 1949 as Agelena fagei, and transferred to the genus Mistaria in 2018.

References

Endemic fauna of Kenya
Agelenidae
Arthropods of Kenya
Spiders of Africa
Spiders described in 1949